Milan Jugović (born 1985) is a politician in Serbia. He has served in the National Assembly of Serbia since October 2020 as a member of the Serbian Progressive Party.

Private career
Jugović has a master's degree in history. He lives in the village of Klupci in Loznica.

Politician

Municipal politics
Jugović received the fourth position on the Progressive Party's electoral list for the Loznica municipal assembly in the 2016 Serbian local elections and was elected when the list won a majority victory with thirty-four mandates. He led the Progressive group in the assembly for the next four years. He was not a candidate for re-election at the local level in 2020.

Parliamentarian
Jugović was awarded the 192nd position on the Progressive Party's Aleksandar Vučić — For Our Children list for the 2020 Serbian parliamentary election and narrowly missed direct election when the list won a landslide majority with 188 of 250 mandates. He is the leader of Serbia's parliamentary friendship group with Guinea-Bissau and a member of the parliamentary friendship groups with Belarus, Bosnia and Herzegovina, and Russia.

References

1985 births
Living people
People from Loznica
Members of the National Assembly (Serbia)
Serbian Progressive Party politicians